Lamont A. Stevens was an American politician from Maine. Stevens, a Democrat from Wells, Maine, served in the Maine House of Representatives for one term (1883-1884). He also served a single term as the 2nd  Maine State Auditor from 1911 to 1913. He was the Democratic Party's candidate for Maine's 1st congressional district in September 1916, which he lost to Louis B. Goodall of Sanford.

References

Year of birth missing
Year of death missing
People from Wells, Maine
Democratic Party members of the Maine House of Representatives
Maine State Auditors